Eugene Stern Paykel (9 September 1934) is a British psychiatrist. He is known for his research work on depression, clinical psychopharmacology and social psychiatry over more than 40 years.

Early life and education
Paykel was born in Auckland, New Zealand,  and received his medical degree at the University of Otago Medical School, Dunedin, followed by training in psychiatry at the Maudsley Hospital London.

Career
He undertook research at Yale University, New Haven USA, where he became co-founder of the depression Research Unit. Returning to London, he worked at St George's Hospital Medical School London, rising to the rank of  Professor of Psychiatry. From 1985 to 2001 he was Professor of Psychiatry and Head of Department at the University of Cambridge, and Fellow, Gonville and Caius College; after retirement, he became  later was Emeritus Professor and Fellow. He published over 400 journal papers and book chapters, and eight books.

Paykel conducted an early controlled trial showing the need to continue antidepressant medication for some months after remission in order to prevent relapse, and a later trial showing depressive relapse prevention by cognitive therapy, effectiveness of antidepressant treatment in milder depression in general practice. He carried out the first study showing conclusively the importance of recent stressful life events in the onset of depression subsequently extended to the role of life events in other psychiatric disorders.

Paykel was   joint founding editor of the Journal of Affective Disorders from 1979 to 1993 and also edited the journal Psychological Medicine from 1994 to 2006. He was Vice-and later President  of the Royal College of Psychiatrists. He was President of the British Association for Psychopharmacology at various times (later Honorary Member) and a member of the  Collegium Internationale Neuropsychopharmacologicum (CINP), and  Marce Society (International Society for Disorders of Childbearing). He was elected a Fellow of the UK Academy of Medical Sciences at its foundation in 1998. He received the  American Psychiatric Association Foundations Fund Prize (jointly), the European College of Neuropsychopharmacology-Lilly Award for Clinical Neuroscience, and the British Association for Psychopharmacology Lifetime Achievement Award.

Selected publications
The Depressed Woman: A study of Social Relationships. (with M.M. Weissman) University of Chicago Press, Chicago (1974)
Handbook of Affective Disorders: 1st ed 1982, 2nd ed 1992. (ed.) E.S. Paykel. Churchill Livingston)
 

Paykel ES, Hollyman JA, Freeling P, Sedgwick P. J "Predictors of therapeutic benefit from amitriptyline in mild depression: a general practice placebo-controlled trial.

References

Who’s Who, Black Publishers Ltd London (http://www.ukwhoswho.com) Annual editions over many years from the 1980s
Debrett’s People of Today, Debrett’s Ltd, Richmond Surrey 2011 (http://www.debretts.com/people/people-today-0) Annual editions from the 1990s 
Introduction of Honorary Fellow: Eugene Paykel. The Psychiatrist (Psychiatric Bulletin) (2001) 25: 491-493. The Royal College of Psychiatrists
Eugene S Paykel interviewed By Thomas Ban, p301-307, in Volume 4 (Psychopharmacology) An Oral History of Neuropsychopharmacology: The First Fifty Years, Peer Interviews Ed Thomas Ban Volume 4 Psychopharmacology Volume Editor Jerome Levine  American College of Neuropsychpharmacology Brentwood Tennessee (ii) E S Paykel e-interview. Psychiatric Bulletin (2007) 31 (1) 40

External links
Paykel, Eugene Emeritus Fellow https://web.archive.org/web/20120426213245/http://www.cai.cam.ac.uk/currentmasterandfellows/eugenepaykel

Living people
1934 births
British psychiatrists
University of Otago alumni
Yale University faculty
Fellows of Gonville and Caius College, Cambridge